Salasiella is a genus of predatory air-breathing land snails, terrestrial pulmonate gastropod mollusks in the family Spiraxidae.

Species 
Some species belonging to this genus are: 

 Salasiella pulchella Pfr., 1856

References 

Spiraxidae